Disney Sing It! – High School Musical 3: Senior Year is a karaoke video game released on November 28, 2008 across multiple platforms, within Europe and on February 17, 2009 in North America.

It's the third game in the Disney Sing It series and the second game of the series focused on the High School Musical franchise. Despite being titled after the third movie, the game features songs from the three movies of the main series. It also features a "Singing lessons" mode with Olesya Rulin as a vocal coach.

It was followed by a fourth game, Disney Sing It: Pop Hits.

Gameplay
Unlike High School Musical: Sing It! which contained animations for the musical numbers, this game is set out exactly like a SingStar game but instead of music videos, they used the actual musical sequence from the film.

It was released in North America on February 17, 2009, coinciding with the DVD and Blu-ray Disc releases of the film. The North American version included an additional 2 songs from High School Musical 2, and 3 songs from High School Musical 3, giving the entire High School Musical 3 songlist.

Disney Sing It: High School Musical 3: Senior Year for the Xbox 360 allows use of the wireless Microsoft Lips microphones. Similarly the PlayStation 3 version allows the use of the SingStar wireless microphones.

Songs
NA: North America Version.

High School Musical
"We're All in This Together"
"Breaking Free"
"When There Was Me and You"
"Stick to the Status Quo"
"Bop to the Top"
"Get'cha Head in the Game"Start of Something New"

High School Musical 2
"All for One"
"Everyday"
"Gotta Go My Own Way"
"I Don't Dance" (NA version only)
"You Are the Music in Me"
"Work This Out" (NA version only)
"Fabulous"
"What Time Is It"

High School Musical 3: Senior Year
"High School Musical"
"Walk Away"
"Scream" (NA version only)
"The Boys Are Back"
"A Night to Remember"
"Just Wanna Be with You"
"Can I Have This Dance?"
"I Want It All"
"Right Here, Right Now" (NA version only) (second verse cut out)
"Now or Never" (NA version only)

Missing Songs (available on other games)
High School Musical 2
"Bet on It" (available on Disney Sing It)
High School Musical 
"What I've Been Looking For"
"What I've Been Looking For" (Reprise)

See alsoHigh School Musical: Sing It!Disney Sing ItDisney Sing It: Pop HitsDisney Sing It: Party HitsDisney Sing It: Family Hits''

References

2008 video games
High School Musical video games
Karaoke video games
Multiplayer and single-player video games
PlayStation 2 games
PlayStation 3 games
Video games developed in the United Kingdom
Wii games
Xbox 360 games
Zoë Mode games